The Indian Railways primarily operates fleet of electric and diesel locomotives, along with several compressed natural gas (CNG) locomotives. Steam locomotives are operated on a few World Heritage Sites and also run occasionally as heritage trains. A locomotive is also known as a loco or more popularly as an engine. The country's first steam locomotive ran on the Red Hill Railway (built by Arthur Cotton to transport granite for road-building) from Red Hills to the Chintadripet bridge in Madras in 1837.

Classification 
Locomotives were classified by track gauge, motive power, function and power (or model number) in a four- or five-letter code. The first letter denotes the track gauge. The second letter denotes motive power (diesel or electric), and the third letter denotes use (goods, passenger, mixed or shunting). The fourth letter denotes a locomotive's chronological model number.

In 2002, a new classification system was adopted. For newer diesel locomotives, the fourth letter denotes their horsepower range. Not all diesel locomotives were reclassified, and the fourth letter continues to denotes their model number.

A locomotive may have a fifth letter, generally denoting a technical variant, subclass or subtype: a variation in the basic model or series, or a different motor or manufacturer. Under the new system, the fifth letter further refines horsepower in 100-hp increments: A for 100 hp, B for 200 hp, C for 300 hp and so on.

The system does not apply to steam locomotives, which are no longer used on main lines. They retain their original class names, such as M- or WP-class.

Syntax 
First letter (gauge):
W – Broad gauge (wide) – 
Y – Metre gauge (yard) – 
Z –  narrow gauge
N –  narrow gauge (toy)
Second letter (motive power):
D – Diesel
C – DC electric (DC overhead line)
A – AC electric (AC overhead line)
CA – DC and AC (AC or DC overhead line); CA is considered one letter
B – Battery (rare)
Third letter (job type):
G – Goods
P – Passenger
M – Mixed (goods and passenger)
S – Shunting (switching)
U – Multiple unit (electric or diesel)
R – Railcar

In WDM 3A, W denotes broad gauge; D denotes diesel power; M denotes mixed use (goods and passenger service), and 3A denotes  (3,000 + 100). In WAP 5, W is broad gauge; A is AC electric; P is passenger service, and 5 indicates that the locomotive is the fifth model used.

Broad-gauge (5 ft 6 in) locomotives

Electric

AC electric 
Broad-gauge AC electric classification codes are:
 WAM – Wide AC electric mixed
 WAP – Wide AC electric passenger
 WAG – Wide AC electric goods
 WAU – Wide AC electric multiple units''''

 AC Mixed class (WAM Series) 

 AC Passenger class (WAP Series) 

 AC Goods class (WAG Series) 

 AC electric multiple unit (WAU series)  
Electric multiple units are designated WAU-1 to WAU-4.

 DC electric 
These locomotives, no longer in use, were used only in and around Mumbai with 1.5 kV DC power. All sections of Central Railway, including Thane to Mumbai CST (Main Line), Nerul to Thane (Trans-Harbour Line), Vadala Road to Mahim (Harbour Line, connecting Central and Western Railway) and Panvel to Mumbai CST (Harbour Line) have been converted to 25 kV AC.

Broad-gauge DC electric classification codes are: 
 WCM – Wide DC electric mixed
 WCP – Wide DC electric passenger
 WCG – Wide DC electric goods
 WCU – Wide DC electric multiple unit

 DC Mixed class (WCM Series) 

 DC Passenger class (WCP Series) 

 DC Goods class (WCG series) 

 DC electric multiple unit (WCU series)  
WCU 1 to WCU 15 electric multiple units (EMU) were used in the Mumbai region.

 Dual (DC and AC) 
Broad-gauge DC and AC electric classification codes are:
WCAM – Wide DC and AC electric mixed
WCAG – Wide DC and AC electric goods

 Dual Current Mixed class (WCAM Series) 

These locomotives are used only in the Mumbai area. They were built to prevent the need to change locos. Mixed locomotives are:

 Dual Current Goods class (WCAG Series) 

 Battery 
Broad-gauge battery classification code is:
 WBCS – Wide battery DC electric shunter
 WCAS – Wide DC(Battery) AC Shunter

 Battery shunter class (WBCS series) 
In 1927, English Electric and WBC built two shunters for yard use in Bombay with Bo-Bo bogies. They were of the WBCS class. These are now preserved in National Rail Museum in Delhi. They were charged using the 1500 V DC OHE which was available there.

 Battery shunter class (WCAS series) 
The locomotives are classified as WCAS. Where W means Wide Gauge, C means DC(Battery), A means AC power, S means Shunting.

 Dual-mode 
Broad-gauge diesel and electric classification code is:
 WDAP – Wide Diesel and AC electric passenger

 Dual mode passenger (WDAP series)  
These locomotives are used on routes that can run on both electrified and non-electrified tracks. Their main purpose is to prevent the need of engine change in electrified routes. Passenger locomotives are:

 Diesel 
Broad-gauge diesel classification codes are:

 WDM – Wide diesel mixed
 WDP – Wide diesel passenger
 WDG – Wide diesel goods
 WDS – Wide diesel shunter
 WCDS – Wide converted diesel shunter
 DEMU – Diesel electric multiple unit
 DHMU – Diesel Hydraulic multiple unit

 Mixed class (WDM Series) 

 Passenger class (WDP Series) 

 Goods class (WDG Series) 

 Shunter Class (WDS Series) 

 Converted shunter class (WCDS series) 
The WCDS6, a YDM4 locomotive, was converted to broad gauge by the Golden Rock Railway Workshop for large industrial companies; the first one was delivered to RITES. New water and air lines were added, the control stand was modified, and it has a dual brake system.

 Diesel multiple units 

A few routes have DMU service. Depending on their transmission system, they are classified as DEMU (diesel-electric transmission) or DHMU (diesel-hydraulic transmission). There is diesel railcar service (known as railbus) in several areas.

 Steam 

Nineteenth-century railway companies ordered custom-built locomotives, usually from British manufacturers. The multiplicity of similar-but-not-identical designs increased manufacturing cost and slowed production. During the 1890s, many British manufacturers were recovering from work outages, thus Indian railway companies looked to Germany and the United States for locomotives. Engines used were:
Bengal Nagpur Railway:
Class F: 0-6-0
Class GM: 2-6-0 (probably modified)
BNR class HSG: 2-8-0+0-8-2 Garratt, India's first successful Garratts
Class M: 4-6-2 (probably modified)
BNR class N: 4-8-0+0-8-4 Garratt, India's largest locomotive. One is preserved at the National Rail Museum, New Delhi
BNR class NM: Similar to N class; ten were built in 1931 by Beyer, Peacock & Company, and it was withdrawn in the late 1960s.
BNR class P: 4-8-2+2-8-4 Garratt; four were built by Beyer, Peacock & Company in 1939. During the early 1970s, they were at the Bhilai (BIA) shed before being withdrawn.
Bombay, Baroda & Central India Railway:
BB&CI class P: 4-6-2
Class A: 2-4-0T, probably an Atlantic; was at the Palej shed.
Class U36: 0-4-2, used on hauling suburban trains in Bombay 
Class D1: 4-4-0; one was named Princess May.
Class M: 4-6-2 (probably modified)
East Indian Railway Company:
Class CT: 0-6-4T, probably converted to a superheater.
EIR class G: 2-2-2T. First two named Express and Fairy Queen. Built in 1855, the latter is the world's oldest locomotive to be in working order. Later rebuilt by Perambur Loco Works. Housed at East Indian Railway (EIR)
EIR class P: 4-6-0
Great Indian Peninsula Railway:
GIPR classes Y1, Y2, Y3, and Y4: 0-8-4T. Used on Thal Ghat as bankers for pushing trains up the Western Ghats.
GIPR Class F and F3: 2-6-0
GIPR class J1: 0-6-0
Class D4: 4-6-0; one is named Hero.
Class D5: 4-6-0 passenger locomotive
Class E1: 4-4-2 Atlantic built by the North British Locomotive Company in 1907–8. Rebuilt with a superheater between 1925 and 1928.
Class T: Tank locomotive used for hauling Mumbai suburban trains
Class Y: 2-8-4T
Crane tank: 0-6-0T; one is preserved at the National Rail Museum in New Delhi.
Madras and Southern Mahratta Railway:
M&SM class V: 4-4-0; one is preserved.
Class BTC: 2-6-4T, based on BESA specifications
Class T: 0-4-2; one is preserved in Madras.
Nizam's Guaranteed State Railway:
NSR class A: 2-6-0T (No. 48, probably an Atlantic) preserved at the National Rail Museum, Delhi. 
North Western State Railway:
Class EM: 4-4-2 (probably modified); one is preserved at the National Rail Museum
NWR class GAS: 2-6-2+2-6-2 Garratt; one built in 1925, and retired in 1937.
NWR class P: 2-4-0
Class E1: 4-4-2
Class N1: 4-8-0
Oudh and Rohilkhand Railway:
Class B26: 0-6-0; one is preserved at the National Rail Museum.
Others:
Class B: 2-6-0
Class E: 2-4-0
Class F: 2-8-2, built between 1926 and 1950 by Nasmyth Wilson for service on Central Railway (CR).
Class G: 2-6-0, probably intended for freight
Class NA2
Class PTC: 2-6-4T, owned by Northern Railway (NR); probably a converted passenger locomotive
Class Y2: 2-8-2T, reclassified L2
Phoenix: 0-4-0T; one is at the National Rail Museum.
Ramgotty: 2-2-0T; the National Rail Museum's oldest locomotive, it was converted to broad gauge.Sultan, Sahib and Sindh: Hauled the train from VT to Thana in 1853.

 Designs 

After acrimonious words in The Times and Parliament, the British Engineering Standards Committee (later the British Engineering Standards Association) began designing a series of locomotives for use by Indian railways. The first two designs emerged in 1903: a 4-4-0 passenger and 0-6-0 goods. They were revised in 1905 and 1906 with additional heavier, more-powerful locomotives:
 Class SP: Standard passenger (4-4-0)
 Class SG: Standard goods (0-6-0)
 Class PT: Passenger tank (2-6-4T)
 Class HP: Heavy passenger (4-6-0)
 Class AP: Atlantic passenger (4-4-2)
 Class HG: Heavy goods (2-8-0)
 Class HT: Heavy tank (2-8-2T)

These advisory BESA designs were customized by the railway companies, which used different classification systems; only the state-operated railways used the class designations SP, SG, PT, HP, AP, HG and HT. When superheating was accepted, superheated versions were classified SPS, SGS and so on (if built with superheaters) and SPC, SGC and so on (if converted from saturated to superheated).

After World War I, larger and more-powerful locomotives were designed by British consulting engineers for the Indian government. They began to appear in 1927:
 Class XA: branch passenger 4-6-2 design, 12.5-ton axle load
 Class XB: light passenger 4-6-2 design, 17-ton axle load
 Class XC: heavy passenger 4-6-2 design, 19.5-ton axle load
 Class XD: Light goods 2-8-2 design, 17-ton axle load
 Class XE: heavy goods 2-8-2 design, 22.5-ton axle load

 Class XF: light shunting 0-8-0 design, 18-ton axle load
 Class XG: heavy shunting 0-8-0 design, 23-ton axle load
 Class XH: 4-cylinder 2-8-2, 28-ton axle load; none were built
 Class XP: experimental passenger 4-6-2, 18.5-ton axle load
 Class XS: experimental 4-cylinder 4-6-2, 21.5-ton axle load
 Class XT: light tank 0-4-2T, 15-ton axle load

During World War II, large numbers of 2-8-2 locomotives were acquired from the United States and Canada and classified AWD and CWD. The Baldwin Locomotive Works adapted the USATC S160 Class locomotive design for India, and it became class AWC. Sixty broad-gauge locomotives were built in 1944 as part of an order of 180 S160 engines. In addition to modified frame spreaders, axles, cylinders, and cab, the Indian locomotives had a turbo generator and electric lighting (not included in the standard European design). Many parts (including boilers) were identical to those in standard-gauge locomotives.

Although new classes were designed shortly before the war, many did not enter service until the post-war period. The new classes were indicated by the change of broad-gauge prefix from X to W'', and plans were implemented to begin manufacturing locomotives in India. The new classes were:
 Class WP: passenger 4-6-2, 18.50-ton axle load
 Class WG: goods 2-8-2, 18.50-ton axle load
 Class WL (1st): light 4-6-2, 16.00-ton axle load (four for North Western Railway in 1939; all to Pakistan during partition of India)
 Class WL (2nd): light 4-6-2, 16.75-ton axle load
 Class WM: 2-6-4T, 16.25-ton axle load
 Class WT: 2-8-4T, 18.00-ton axle load
 Class WU: 2-4-2T, 16.50-ton axle load
 Class WV: 2-6-2T, 16.25-ton axle load
 Class WW: 0-6-2T, 16.50-ton axle load

All broad-gauge steam locomotives in India have been withdrawn from normal service, with only occasional steam specials continuing to operate.

Metre-gauge (3 ft 3⅜ in) locomotives

Electric 
Metre-gauge electric classification codes are:

 YAM – Metre gauge AC electric mixed
 YCG – Metre gauge DC electric goods
 YAU – Metre gauge AC electric multiple units

AC mixed class (YAM Series)

DC goods class (YCG series)

AC multiple units (YAU series) 
In the Chennai area.

Diesel 
Metre-gauge diesel classification code is:
 YDM – Metre gauge diesel mixed

Mixed class (YDM Series)

Steam 
Nilgiri Mountain Railway X class
BESA designs:
 Passenger (4-6-0)
 Mixed (4-6-0)
 Goods (4-8-0)
 Tank (2-6-2T)
Indian Railway Standards designs of the late 1920s
Class YA: 4-6-2 with 9-ton axle load (none built)
 Class YB: 4-6-2 with 10-ton axle load (161 built for India and 50 for Burma)
 Class YC: 4-6-2 with 12-ton axle load (15 built for India and 13 for Burma)
 Class YD: 2-8-2 with 10-ton axle load (171 built for India, 61 for Burma, and 25 for East Pakistan)
 Class YE: 2-8-2 with 12-ton axle load (none built)
 Class YF: 0-6-2 with 8-ton axle load; later examples were 2-6-2 (111 built for India)
 Class YK: 2-6-0 version of the 2-6-2 YF, 8-ton axle load (25 built for India)
Class YT: 0-4-2T with 8-ton axle load (2 built for India)
Wartime designs:
 Class MAWD: 2-8-2 USATC S118 Class
 Class MWGX: 4-6-2+2-6-4 Garratt
Indian Railway Standards post war designs
 Class YL: 2-6-2 mixed traffic locomotive with 8-ton axle load (264 built 1953–1957)
 Class YG: 2-8-2 goods locomotive with 10-ton axle load (1074 built 1949–1972)
 Class YP: 4-6-2 passenger locomotive with 10-ton axle load (871 built 1949–1970)
Class YM 2-6-4T with 9-ton axle load (12 built 1956)

Narrow-gauge (2 ft 6 in and 2 ft) locomotives

Diesel 
Narrow-gauge diesel classification codes are:
 ZDM – Narrow gauge 2 ft 6 in diesel mixed
 NDM – Narrow gauge 2 ft diesel mixed

Mixed class (ZDM series)

Mixed class (NDM series)

Steam

2 ft 6 in 
Barsi Light Railway:
Class A: 0-8-4T
Class B: 4-8-4T
Class C: 0-6-0ST
Class D: 0-4-0
Class E: Sentinel railcars
Class F: 2-8-2
Class G: 4-6-4
Indian Railway Standards:
Class ZA: 2-6-2 with 4.5-ton axle load (none built)
Class ZB: 2-6-2 with 6-ton axle load
Class ZC: 2-8-2 with 6-ton axle load (none built)
 Class ZD: 4-6-2 with 8-ton axle load (none built)
Class ZE: 2-8-2 with 8-ton axle load
Class ZF: 2-6-2T with 8-ton axle load

2 ft 

Darjeeling Himalayan Railway:
 DHR A Class: 0-4-0WT;
 DHR B Class: 0-4-0ST; #777 and #778 preserved
 DHR C Class: 4-6-2
 DHR D Class: 0-4-0+0-4-0 Garratt
Indian Railway Standards (none built):
 QA: 2-6-2 with 4.5-ton axle load
 QB: 2-6-2 with 6-ton axle load 
 QC: 2-8-2 with 6-ton axle load

Battery 
Narrow-gauge battery classification code is: 
 NBM – Narrow gauge 2 ft battery mixed

Mixed class (NBM series) 
NBM-1: Designed by BHEL in 1987

See also 
 List of electric locomotives of India
 List of diesel locomotives of India
 Rail transport in India
 Indian Railways
 List of locomotive builders

References

Notes

Bibliography

External links 

Indian railway fan club

 
 
 
 
Indian railway-related lists